Salajwe is a village in Kweneng District of Botswana. It is located in central Botswana, in Kalahari Desert, 70 km north-west of Letlhakeng. The population of Salajwe was 1,705 in 2001 census.

References

Kweneng District
Villages in Botswana